Rod drawing may refer to:

Bar drawing, the drawing of solid stock through a die to decrease its cross-section
Rod drawing, a specific type of tube drawing that uses a rod as a mandrel